Ekaterina Tretyakova (born 19 October 1984) is a Russian volleyball player for Leningradka Saint Petersburg and the Russian national team.

She played for VC Universitet-Tekhnolog Belgorod.
She participated at the 2017 Women's European Volleyball Championship. and the 2017 FIVB Volleyball Women's World Grand Champions Cup.

References

External links 
 FIVB profile

1984 births
Living people
Russian expatriates in Serbia
Russian women's volleyball players
Sportspeople from Chelyabinsk